Wesley Livsey Jones (October 9, 1863November 19, 1932) was an American politician who served in  the United States House of Representatives and the United States Senate representing the state of Washington.

Born near Bethany, Illinois days after the death of his father, who was serving in the Union Army during the American Civil War, Jones grew up working on farms. He taught school before graduating from Southern Illinois College in Enfield, Illinois.  He studied law in Chicago, passed the bar, and became active in politics as a Republican.  In 1889, he moved to North Yakima, in eastern Washington, where he worked in real estate and practiced law.  In 1898, he was elected as a Republican to the United States House of Representatives, where he served five terms.  He won a seat in the United States Senate in 1908; he served from 1909 until his death, and served in both leadership positions and as chairman of several Senate committees.

Jones lost his 1932 bid for reelection. He died soon after the November election, but before his term expired in March 1933.  He died in Seattle, and was interred at Seattle's Bonney-Watson Mortuary.

Early life
Jones was born near Bethany, Illinois, the son of Wesley and Phoebe Jones; he was born three days after the death of his father, who was serving as a private in Company B, 41st Illinois Volunteer Infantry Regiment during the American Civil War.  He graduated from Southern Illinois College in Enfield, Illinois, and studied law in Chicago while teaching school at night.

He passed the bar in 1886, and started a law practice in Decatur, Illinois.  He also began to get active in politics, having joined the Republican Party. While living in Illinois, Jones campaigned for James G. Blaine for president in 1884, and for Benjamin Harrison in 1888.

Marriage and family
In 1886 Jones also married Minda Nelson, starting a family.  They had two children together, daughter Hazel E. and son Harry B. Jones.   Hazel Jones later married Arthur Coffin.

Move to Washington state
In 1889, Jones moved to North Yakima, in eastern Washington. It was a developing area near the Yakima River. He worked in the real estate business and continued to practice law.

The town developed near the Yakama Indian Reservation, where several related peoples had been settled since the mid-nineteenth century, when they signed a treaty ceding millions of acres of land to the United States.

Political career
After moving to Washington state, Jones became was active in the Sons of Union Veterans of the Civil War. His leadership roles in the organization gave him name recognition that enabled him to begin a political career.   Beginning in 1890, Jones was a sought-after campaign speaker in Washington, and took part in Republican rallies throughout the state.

In 1898, Jones was elected to represent Washington's at-large congressional district. He was reelected four times, and served in the U.S. House from March 4, 1899, to March 3, 1909.

In 1908, Jones ran successfully for a seat representing Washington in the United States Senate. He was first elected by the state legislature, but, after passage of the 17th amendment to the US Constitution in 1913, he was later elected by popular vote.   Jones was reelected by popular vote in 1914, 1920, and 1926; he served from March 3, 1909, until his death. In 1917, Jones moved from Yakima to Seattle, the state's major city and port, located on Puget Sound on the west side of the Cascade Mountains.

In the Senate, Jones advanced to a leadership position as Majority Whip, a post he held from 1924 to 1929.  He also served as chairman of several committees, including: Industrial Expositions (61st Congress); Fisheries (62nd Congress); Disposition of Useless Executive Papers (64th and 65th Congresses); Investigate Trespassers Upon Indian Land (65th Congress); Commerce (66th through 71st Congresses); and Appropriations (71st and 72nd Congresses).

Jones was a successful advocate for federal investment in the Pacific Northwest. He secured funding for several irrigation projects, which particularly aided farmers in the more arid eastern part of the state. In 1906 he proposed a bill requiring the Yakama Nation to give up three-quarters of their land in order to gain any irrigation rights. This was opposed not only by the confederated tribes but by their allied European-American advocates, such as Lucullus Virgil McWhorter, a prominent rancher in Yakima who worked to support Native American rights and culture. In 1914 Jones's bill finally died in committee.

Jones also gained construction of a large naval facility, the Puget Sound Navy Yard in Bremerton, on the west side of Puget Sound. It was important to the area economy and continues to provide many jobs in the area.  In 1920 he sponsored and secured passage of the Jones Merchant Marine Act, which stipulated that only American ships could carry cargo between American ports, thereby making Alaska dependent on Seattle-based shipping.

Jones was a vocal proponent of prohibition throughout his political career. Initially this aided his popularity, but it likely contributed to his electoral defeat in 1932. The 28-point loss may be the largest of any major-party nominee in history. More importantly, the Great Depression had set in, and many Republicans lost to Democrats in this election, as voter sought other solutions to growing unemployment. Jones was defeated by Democrat Homer Bone, who swept in with President Franklin D. Roosevelt.

Death and burial
Jones died in Seattle on November 19, 1932, shortly after losing reelection to his Senate seat, but before his final term had expired.  A replacement was appointed to serve until the next election. His ashes were interred at Bonney-Watson Mortuary in Seattle.

See also
 List of United States Congress members who died in office (1900–49)

References

Sources
Books

Magazines

Internet

Newspapers

External links

Wesley L. Jones papers - University of Washington

|-

|-

|-

|-

|-

|-

|-

|-

|-

|-

1863 births
1932 deaths
American temperance activists
Illinois lawyers
Illinois Republicans
People from Decatur, Illinois
People from Moultrie County, Illinois
Politicians from Yakima, Washington
Republican Party members of the United States House of Representatives from Washington (state)
Republican Party United States senators from Washington (state)
Washington (state) lawyers